Lloyd John Saxton (born 18 April 1990) is an former English footballer who played as a goalkeeper.

Career
Saxton was born in Alsager and played in the academies at Liverpool, Bolton Wanderers and Stoke City before turning professional with Plymouth Argyle in 2008. He was released by Argyle in May 2010 without making a first team appearance. Saxton spent the 2010–11 season at Bradford City but failed to make an appearance. Saxton then played for non-league Vauxhall Motors before moving to Sweden to play for Ånge IF. Saxton joined GIF Sundsvall in February 2015. He made his Allsvenskan debut on 7 June 2015 in a 1–1 draw with Kalmar FF. In January 2021, it was announced that after five years, Saxton would be leaving Sundsvall.

On April 1 2021, Saxton announced on his social media that he had retired from football despite having several offers from teams in Sweden.

Personal life
In October 2018, Saxton became a Swedish citizen.

References

External links
 

1990 births
Living people
English footballers
Swedish footballers
Allsvenskan players
Liverpool F.C. players
Bolton Wanderers F.C. players
Stoke City F.C. players
Plymouth Argyle F.C. players
Bradford City A.F.C. players
Vauxhall Motors F.C. players
Ånge IF players
GIF Sundsvall players
People from Alsager
Association football goalkeepers
English expatriate footballers
Naturalized citizens of Sweden
English expatriate sportspeople in Sweden
Superettan players
Division 2 (Swedish football) players
Division 3 (Swedish football) players